Laser & Photonics Reviews is a bimonthly peer-reviewed scientific journal covering research on all aspects of optical science. It is published by Wiley-VCH and contains reviews and original papers/letters. The journal was established in 2007 by the founding editor-in-chief Theodor W. Hänsch (Ludwig Maximilian University of Munich). Originally, the journal only published review articles. Since 2012, it also contains original papers and letters. According to the Journal Citation Reports, the journal has a 2020 impact factor of 13.138, ranking it 4th out of 99 journals in the category Optics, 12th out of 160 journals in the category Physics Applied, and 8th out of 69 journals in the category Physics Condensed Matter.

References

External links 
 

Optics journals
Wiley-VCH academic journals
Bimonthly journals
Publications established in 2007
English-language journals